Mic Mac Amateur Aquatic Club (MMAAC) is located on Lake Banook in Dartmouth, Nova Scotia, Canada. This organization provides structured recreational and competitive paddling, rowing, dragon boat, and swimming programs to the local community ages 6+. Summer day camp programs are also offered for kids ages 6-12. 

The club is part of Canoe Kayak Canada and Rowing Canada. MMAAC shares the beautiful Lake Banook with Banook Canoe Club, Senobe Aquatic Club, North Star Rowing Club, and Dragonboat East.

Many local, provincial, national, and even world events are held for these programs each year on Lake Banook.

CKC Nationals
At the 2006 Canadian National Sprint Canoe/Kayak Championships in Regina, Saskatchewan, Mic Mac AAC came in third overall.  The club finished behind champion Missisauga and Burloak.  Mic Mac AAC also won the Juvenile Women's Burgee.

Staff 
Paddling Coaches
 Head Coach - Chris Chaisson 
Rowing Staff
Head Coach - TBD

External links 
 http://www.micmacaac.com/

References

Sport in Halifax, Nova Scotia
Canoe clubs in Canada